Lamborn (first name and dates unknown) was a significant English cricketer who played for the Hambledon Club in the 18th century and is recognised as one of the greatest innovators in the history of bowling.

Career
Lamborn made 22 known appearances in first-class cricket, beginning with Surrey in 1777. He played for Chertsey Cricket Club in 1778.  He played several games for All-England and then for Hampshire from 1780.  In 1781, he was also associated with Sir Horatio Mann in the east Kent but was not recorded again after that season.

Few personal details of Lamborn are known, though it has been supposed his first name was William, but this is based on an error arising from confusion with the much later cricketer William Lambert.  Lamborn's nickname among his fellow players was "The Little Farmer", which does at least give some clues concerning his size and occupation.

Innovation
Lamborn seems to have been something of a sensation in his apparently short career for he was a most unorthodox bowler.  He was a right arm underarm spin bowler with a low, flighted delivery and what has been described as a "twist from off to leg" (i.e., an off-break).  The natural way for an underarm bowler to spin the ball is the leg-break (i.e., from the leg side and towards the off side of a right-handed batsman) but Lamborn seems to have invented the off-break by spinning from the off side and towards the leg side of a right-handed batsman.  It is said he was "no batter" and the scorecards confirm this.

The pitched delivery was still new, having been introduced in the 1760s, when Lamborn played.  Until the 1760s, bowlers had always rolled or skimmed the ball towards the batsman so spin bowling itself was a new skill.  According to John Nyren, Lamborn was "the first I remember who introduced this deceitful and teasing style of delivering the ball".

Anecdote
Lamborn is the subject of a famous anecdote in which he informed the Duke of Dorset about one near miss that: "It was tedious near your Grace!"  Lamborn had a strong rural accent and the way he said this apparently amused the Duke for some time to come.

References

Bibliography
 Derek Birley, A Social History of English Cricket, Aurum, 1999
 G B Buckley, Fresh Light on 18th Century Cricket, Cotterell, 1935
 Arthur Haygarth, Scores & Biographies, Volume 1 (1744–1826), Lillywhite, 1862
 Ashley Mote, The Glory Days of Cricket, Robson, 1997
 John Nyren, The Cricketers of my Time (ed. Ashley Mote), Robson, 1998
 H T Waghorn, The Dawn of Cricket, Electric Press, 1906

Date of birth unknown
Date of death unknown
English cricketers
English cricketers of 1701 to 1786
Surrey cricketers
Hampshire cricketers
East Kent cricketers
Chertsey cricketers